Mangelia farina is a species of sea snail, a marine gastropod mollusk in the family Mangeliidae.

This is a nomen dubium.

Description
The length of the shell attains 7 mm.

Distribution
This marine species occurs in the Mediterranean Sea off the Baleares, Spain,

References

 Nordsieck, Fritz. The Turridae of the European seas. La Piramide, 1977.

External links
  Tucker, J.K. 2004 Catalog of recent and fossil turrids (Mollusca: Gastropoda). Zootaxa 682:1–1295.
 

farina
Gastropods described in 1977